Adjukru (Adioukrou, Adyoukrou, Adyukru, Ajukru) is a language spoken in Ivory Coast by the Adjoukrou people. It has an uncertain classification within the Kwa branch of the Niger–Congo family.

See also 

 Adjoukrou people

References 

Languages of Ivory Coast
Lagoon languages